Negasonic Teenage Warhead (Ellie Phimister) is a character appearing in American comic books published by Marvel Comics. Created by Grant Morrison and Frank Quitely, the character first appeared in New X-Men #115 (2001). She is named after the song "Negasonic Teenage Warhead" by Monster Magnet. She belongs to a subspecies of humans called mutants, who are born with superhuman abilities. Negasonic Teenage Warhead's appearance and powers were eventually altered in the comics to match her appearance in the Deadpool films.

Publication history

Negasonic Teenage Warhead first appeared in New X-Men #115 (2001), written by Grant Morrison and illustrated by Frank Quitely.

Fictional character biography

Ellie Phimister was a Genoshan teenager, with pale skin and dark hair, who dressed as a goth and was a student of Emma Frost's telepathy class. During a tutoring session, Ellie reported having a recurring nightmare 50 times the previous night where all people in Genosha were exterminated. She then pointed out that she had experienced the same vision during the class. Almost simultaneously, Cassandra Nova's Wild Sentinels appear on Genosha and wipe out half the world's mutant population: 16 million people.

Carrying what appeared to be Ellie's corpse, Emma Frost, who had survived the Genoshan genocide thanks to the manifestation of her secondary mutation turning her into diamond, was found by the X-Men's Beast and Jean Grey. Emma proclaimed the teenager, who had named herself Negasonic Teenage Warhead, to be a credit to her family and the mutant race and then suffered a mental breakdown when she found out Ellie was dead.

Illusion
Much later, Negasonic Teenage Warhead was apparently seen to be alive as a member of the latest incarnation of the Inner Circle of the Hellfire Club, alongside Cassandra Nova, Sebastian Shaw, Perfection, and Emma Frost. The new Inner Circle attacked the X-Men at the Xavier Institute. While Shaw, Frost, and Nova dealt with Beast, Wolverine, and Colossus, Ellie claimed she had a dream of Shadowcat phasing down into the Earth's core and was unable to stop; the suggestion caused Shadowcat to lose control of her phasing powers.

Later, a comatose Cyclops wakes up and begins shooting the members of the Club, including Ellie, with a pistol. It is revealed, however, that Ellie and all the other members of the Hellfire Club were projections of Emma Frost's mind; these projections disappeared after they were revealed to be illusions.

After hearing Negasonic Teenage Warhead's codename, Shadowcat remarks, "Wow, we really have run out of names."

Necrosha
During the Necrosha event, Negasonic Teenage Warhead is revealed to be amongst the deceased mutant population of Genosha that is resurrected by the Transmode Virus by Selene and Eli Bard. However, unlike the other resurrected mutants, Ellie isn't under Selene's control as seen when she refused to tell the Black Queen her real name. Ellie apparently perished once again when the Black Queen absorbed the souls of the entire deceased mutant populace of Genosha.

Marvel NOW!
Ellie remained alive after the events of the 2009–2010 "Necrosha", storyline, and at some point dropped her Gothic wardrobe and appearance. She uses her telepathic and precognitive abilities to establish a new, mundane life for herself in an Albuquerque suburb. Deadpool and the Mercs for Money capture her at the behest of an organization called Umbral Dynamics, unaware that the group intends to siphon her power into the Presence. After her rescue and the defeat of Presence, Negasonic Teenage Warhead adopts a new punk-inspired look and joins up with Domino's incarnation of the Mercs for Money alongside Hit-Monkey.

While Deadpool was sulking that Domino had stolen his team from him, she chose to cheer him up while out on an operation for S.H.I.E.L.D, using her powers to make Deadpool-themed costumes for everybody. It is later revealed after the Mercs probe their employers while getting their pay, that Hit-Monkey was assigned to them as a liaison to monitor their progress. In truth, however, he was sent to keep an eye on Ellie because S.H.I.E.L.D was wary of her growing abilities.

During a fight in an alternate future brought about by Negasonic's intervention in the Inhumans vs. X-Men storyline, the conflict between the two superpowered races never died down. Instead, they were further inflamed by the Inhuman fanatic Lash, who instigated a witch hunt against the Mutants, whom he deems have blasphemed against the T-Mist cloud and, in response to mutant deaths caused by them, Magneto launched a counter-assault which ended up decimating the world. She chose to hide out deep in the Amazon with an enclave of mutants who were tired from all the fighting with the Inhumans, but Lash and his tribe soon caught up with them when Deadpool's Mercs inadvertently led them there. As Deadpool lay dying due to the former absorbing her energies, the future Negasonic travels back to the past in order to fix her mistake of tampering with the T-Cloud, thus averting another dystopian parallel.

Negasonic is the only one of the Mercs to remain in Deadpool's employ after his defection to Hydra during Secret Empire and subsequent memory wipe at the conclusion of The Despicable Deadpool, helping him run a new business called "Deadpool, Gun/Swords for Hire."

Powers and abilities
Ellie possesses superhuman strength, speed, durability and reflexes. She is able to overpower a host of skilled, military, or uniquely trained mercenaries in hand-to-hand combat, as well as showcasing superhuman physical prowess beyond the norm, battling the likes of Scorpia and Titania. She can read the thoughts of others and project her own with her telepathic abilities. She possesses precognitive abilities. She is the only person aware that Proteus has possessed Destiny and she shows her precognitive abilities, announcing to Selene the imminent return of her victorious inner circle. Ellie showcased a host of new abilities she previously lacked, creating a house and home for herself out of thin air with her thoughts. She has the ability to harness, generate, and absorb radioactive energy into herself, allowing her to achieve feats such as fabricating objects out of thin air like clothes or shelter and levitating people or objects with her mind.

It is later revealed that Ellie's newfound power stems from an ability to manipulate reality at a quantum level. In an alternate dystopian future, Negasonic used her powers to alter the Terrigen cloud to make it harmless to mutants. Further exhibitions of her power include rearranging matter and energy into different shapes and forms at will, such as morphing Jack Chain's Darkforce binds into butterflies, changing Inferno's fire into flaming monkeys, mentally disassembling Domino's and Gorilla-Man's guns, and creating energized duplicates of herself at will.

Reception

Accolades 

 In 2017, CBR.com ranked Negasonic Teenage Warhead 15th in their "15 Most Important Women in Deadpool’s Life" list.
 In 2020, Scary Mommy included Negasonic Teenage Warhead in their "Looking For A Role Model? These 195+ Marvel Female Characters Are Truly Heroic" list.
 In 2022, The A.V. Club ranked Negasonic Teenage Warhead 99th in their "100 best Marvel characters" list.
 In 2022, CBR.com ranked Negasonic Teenage Warhead 8th in their "Gorr The God-Butcher And 9 Other Over-The-Top Names Comics Fans Love" list.

In other media

Film

 Negasonic Teenage Warhead appears in Deadpool, portrayed by Brianna Hildebrand. This version is an X-Men trainee who possesses Cannonball's ability to create high-impact kinetic charges, which was achieved after 20th Century Fox and Marvel Studios struck a deal to allow the latter to use Ego the Living Planet in the film Guardians of the Galaxy Vol. 2 in exchange for changing Negasonic's powers. Additionally, the writers selected her because they liked her name and thought that a goth girl with Cannonball's powers would be a better choice for the film than Cannonball himself.
 Negasonic Teenage Warhead appears in Deadpool 2, portrayed again by Brianna Hildebrand. As of this film, she has become a full member of the X-Men and entered a relationship with Yukio.

Video games
 Negasonic Teenage Warhead appears as a playable character in Marvel: Future Fight.
 Negasonic Teenage Warhead appears as a playable character in Marvel Strike Force.
 Negasonic Teenage Warhead appears in Marvel Puzzle Quest.
 Negasonic Teenage Warhead appears in Marvel Snap.

References

External links
 

Comics characters introduced in 2001
Characters created by Frank Quitely
Characters created by Grant Morrison
Deadpool characters
Female characters in film
Fictional characters with nuclear or radiation abilities
Fictional characters with precognition
Fictional telekinetics
Fictional LGBT characters in film
Genoshans
Marvel Comics characters with superhuman strength
Marvel Comics characters who can move at superhuman speeds
Marvel Comics female superheroes
Marvel Comics film characters
Marvel Comics mutants
Marvel Comics telepaths
Teenage superheroes
X-Men supporting characters